Tampalakamam massacre happened on February 1, 1998 when eight (8) minority Sri Lankan Tamil civilians were taken to the nearby police station and shot dead by Sri Lankan police and majority Sinhalese home guards. The victims include a 13- and a 17-year-old boy. One of the school boys killed was Arumugam Segaran, who had his penis cut off and placed in his mouth by the perpetrators. Later one of the accused in the murder case was shot dead by unknown gunmen

Incident
On the day of the incident about twenty (20) police arrested the victims. After taking the victims inside the police post they were shot at close range. The Kantalai police reportedly went house to house pressuring the families to write and sign statement stating that those victims were killed by the LTTE or that they were killed by members of the LTTE. Later a national television channel reported that six (6) LTTE cadres were killed at Tampalakamam .

Result
The alleged police officers have not been arrested. They were instead transferred to Kantalai police station and are still on duty.

References 

1998 crimes in Sri Lanka
Attacks on civilians attributed to the Sri Lanka Civil Security Force
Attacks on civilians attributed to the Sri Lanka Police
Massacres in Sri Lanka
Massacres in 1998
Mass murder of Sri Lankan Tamils
People shot dead by law enforcement officers in Sri Lanka
Sri Lankan government forces attacks in Eelam War III
Terrorist incidents in Sri Lanka in 1998